The 14th Iowa Infantry Regiment was an infantry regiment that served in the Union Army during the American Civil War.

Service
The 14th Iowa Infantry was organized at Davenport, Iowa, and mustered in for three years of Federal service on November 6, 1861.

The regiment was mustered out on August 8, 1865.

Total strength and casualties
The 14th Iowa mustered a total of 1,720 during its existence.

It suffered 5 officers and 59 enlisted men who were killed in action or who died of their wounds and 1 officer and 138 enlisted men who died of disease, for a total of 203 fatalities.

Commanders
 Colonel William T. Shaw

See also
List of Iowa Civil War Units
Iowa in the American Civil War

Notes

References
The Civil War Archive

Units and formations of the Union Army from Iowa
1861 establishments in Iowa
Military units and formations established in 1861
Military units and formations disestablished in 1865